James Monroe Miller (May 6, 1852 – January 20, 1926) was a U.S. Representative from Kansas.

Born in Three Springs, Pennsylvania, Miller attended the district school and  graduated from Lycoming College, Williamsport, Pennsylvania, in 1875.
He moved to Skiddy, Kansas, in 1875.

Miller was Superintendent of schools in Council Grove, Kansas, for two terms, and while holding this position studied law. He was admitted to the bar in 1879 and commenced practice in Council Grove, Kansas. Miller was elected prosecuting attorney of Morris County, Kansas, in 1880 and again in 1884 and 1886. He served as member of the State house of representatives in 1894 and 1895.

Miller was elected as a Republican to the Fifty-sixth and to the five succeeding Congresses (March 4, 1899 – March 3, 1911). He served as chairman of the Committee on Claims (Fifty-ninth and Sixtieth Congresses), Committee on Elections No. 2 (Sixty-first Congress). He was an unsuccessful candidate for renomination in 1910.

Miller resumed the practice of law in Council Grove, Kansas, and died there January 20, 1926. He was interred in Greenwood Cemetery.

References

1852 births
1926 deaths
Republican Party members of the Kansas House of Representatives
People from Huntingdon County, Pennsylvania
People from Morris County, Kansas
Republican Party members of the United States House of Representatives from Kansas
People from Council Grove, Kansas